Chrysobothris purpureovittata is a species of metallic wood-boring beetle in the family Buprestidae. It is found in North America.

Subspecies
These two subspecies belong to the species Chrysobothris purpureovittata:
 Chrysobothris purpureovittata cercocarpi Westcott & Nelson, 2000
 Chrysobothris purpureovittata purpureovittata Horn, 1886

References

Further reading

 
 
 

Buprestidae
Articles created by Qbugbot
Beetles described in 1886